Jason Kardong is a pedal steel player based out of Seattle, Washington and is the Pedal Steel player for Sera Cahoone. Originally from outside of Moscow, Idaho, he grew up directly next door to folk artist Josh Ritter. Shortly after graduating from Washington State University (WSU) with a BS in Agriculture, he relocated to Seattle Washington.

His first band after moving to Seattle was the retro western swing six piece band called Six String Eric and his Lazy Ranch Hands who performed along the West Coast opening for such acts as The Lucky Stars, Big Sandy & His Fly-Rite Boys, Wanda Jackson and Dave Stuckey.

In 2003 he co-founded the band The Wakefields and shortly after began also playing with Sera Cahoone.  Currently he also is involved with The Beautiful Confusion, Massy Ferguson and Grand Archives

Kardong is also active as an audio engineer working with such artists as Betsy Olson, Widower and The Wakefields.  He graduated from the Audio Engineering program at the University of Washington.  and has worked at such studios as Jupiter Studios, Soundhouse and MRX.  He also started the music label Eminence Records  in 2005 as a way to promote his music.

Member Of/ Performed With 
Son Volt, 
Jeffrey Foucault,
Matt Costa, 
Sera Cahoone,
Grand Archives, Anna Coogan, Carissa's Wierd, The Beautiful Confusion, Massy Ferguson, The Souvenirs, Ole Tinder, The Wakefields

Collaborations / Tour With 
Band of Horses
, 
Son Volt, 
Matt Costa, 
and Grand Archives. Recently he appeared on the song "If You've Lost Someone" by Three Ninjas

Gear 
Kardong plays a Rittenberry as well as a Carter steel guitar. He uses various amplifiers but plays mainly through a Milkman Sound Amplifier  and plays a Creston  custom guitar.

Trivia 
 J. was an extra in the Kenny Chesney video "Me and You" VIDEO
 His uncle Don Kardong placed 4th in the 1976 Olympic Marathon
 Has toured with Son Volt, Matt Costa, Grand Archives, Band of Horses, Lucinda Williams
 Cousin of L.A. ceramic artist Rebeccah Kardong

Partial Discography

References 

 Sub Pop Records
 Grand Archives
 DiscOgs
 [ AllMusic]

External links 
 J Kardong Main Website
 Eminence Records Website
 Sera Cahoone Website
 Grand Archives Website

Pedal steel guitarists
Living people
Year of birth missing (living people)
Washington State University alumni
Musicians from Seattle
Guitarists from Idaho
Guitarists from Washington (state)
American male guitarists